is a railway freight terminal located in Ryūtsūdanchi 1-Jō 5-chōme, Asahikawa, Hokkaidō, and operated by the Japan Freight Railway Company (JR Freight).

The terminal is situated on the Soya Main Line.

Lines serviced
JR Hokkaidō (owner) / JR Freight (freight train operator)
Sōya Main Line

Railway stations in Hokkaido Prefecture
Stations of Japan Freight Railway Company
Railway freight terminals in Japan
Railway stations in Japan opened in 1968
Buildings and structures in Asahikawa